The Mad Women's Ball (French: Le bal des folles) is a 2021 French supernatural thriller film directed by Mélanie Laurent from a screenplay by Laurent and Christophe Deslandes. It is based upon the novel Le bal des folles by Victoria Mas, and stars Laurent, Lou de Laâge, Emmanuelle Bercot, Benjamin Voisin, Cédric Kahn and Grégoire Bonnet.

It had its world premiere at the 2021 Toronto International Film Festival on 12 September 2021 and was released for streaming on 17 September 2021 by Amazon Studios.

Cast
 Lou de Laâge as Eugénie Cléry
 Mélanie Laurent as Geneviève Gleizes 
 Emmanuelle Bercot as Jeanne
 Martine Chevallier as Grand-mère Cléry
 Benjamin Voisin as Théophile Cléry
 Cédric Kahn as François Cléry
 Lomane de Dietrich as Louise
 Christophe Montenez as Jules
 Coralie Russier as Henriette
 Lauréna Thellier as Marguerite 
 Martine Schambacher as Thérèse
 Valérie Stroh as Mère Cléry
 André Marcon as Dr. Gleizes 
 Grégoire Bonnet as Dr. Jean-Martin Charcot

Production
In January 2020, it was announced that Mélanie Laurent would write and direct a film based upon the novel Le bal des folles by Victoria Mas, with Alain Goldman serving as a producer under his Légende Films banner. In June 2020, it was announced that Laurent and Lou de Laâge had joined the cast of the film, with Gaumont Film Company set to distribute the film in France. In November 2020, it was further announced that Emmanuelle Bercot, Benjamin Voisin, Cédric Khan and Grégoire Bonnet had joined the cast of the film, with Amazon Studios distributing worldwide and with Gaumont no longer distributing.

Principal photography began in November 2020.

The soundtrack was composed by Asaf Avidan and performed by Avidan (Piano and Keyboards) and Coleman Itzkoff (Cello).

Release
The Mad Woman's Ball had its world premiere at the 2021 Toronto International Film Festival on 12 September 2021. It was released on Amazon Prime on 17 September 2021.

Reception

On Rotten Tomatoes  the film has an 85% approval rating based on 54 reviews, with an average rating of 7/10. The site's critical consensus reads, "Its themes are occasionally undercut by its storytelling, but outstanding performances give The Mad Women's Ball a poignant, disturbing power." On Metacritic, the film has a rating of 72 out of 100, based on reviews from 14 critics, indicating "generally favorable reviews".

Peter Bradshaw of The Guardian wrote: "Contrived and possibly overheated though the film might be at times, there is real storytelling gusto to it, and Laurent punches it across with relish."

References

External links
 

2021 films
2021 thriller drama films
French thriller films
Films directed by Mélanie Laurent
Amazon Studios films
Films about medical malpractice
Films set in psychiatric hospitals
Amazon Prime Video original films
Films set in the 1880s
2020s French films